Oldfield Road railway station served the western part of Salford, in North West England, between 1852 and 1872.

History

In February 1853 it was renamed Oldfield Road, Salford; and in September 1854 it became Salford (Oldfield Road).

A direct connecting line between Salford and Manchester Victoria was opened on 1 August 1865, and as a result trains from Bolton to Manchester Victoria could now call at Salford; that month, Salford (Oldfield Road) resumed its original name of Oldfield Road. The 1865 connecting line made Oldfield Road redundant, but it was not closed until 2 December 1872.

Notes

References

External links
Position of Oldfield Road Station on navigable 1948 O.S. map

Disused railway stations in Salford
Former Lancashire and Yorkshire Railway stations
Railway stations in Great Britain opened in 1852
Railway stations in Great Britain closed in 1872
1852 establishments in England